Martín Ramos Castellanos (born 14 January 1961) is a Mexican politician affiliated with the Party of the Democratic Revolution. As of 2014, he served as Deputy of the LX Legislature of the Mexican Congress representing Chiapas.

References

1961 births
Living people
People from Chiapas
Party of the Democratic Revolution politicians
21st-century Mexican politicians
Deputies of the LX Legislature of Mexico
Members of the Chamber of Deputies (Mexico) for Chiapas